East Lynne is a 1931 American pre-Code film version of Ellen Wood's eponymous 1861 novel, which was adapted by Tom Barry and Bradley King and directed by Frank Lloyd. (The adaptation was sufficiently different from Wood's original novel that the screenplay was in turn novelized for a Grosset and Dunlap Photoplay Edition by Arline de Haas.) The film received an Academy Award nomination for Best Picture but lost to RKO-Radio's Cimarron.  East Lynne is a melodrama starring Ann Harding, Clive Brook, Conrad Nagel and Cecilia Loftus.

Only one print of the film is known to exist, though bootleg DVD copies exist minus the final scene. This print is in good shape, although several frames have an "X" on them, indicating they were to be removed in the film editing stage. One frame has a "crosshairs" on it, while several frames have ink marks. People may view the film at University of California Los Angeles's Instructional Media Lab, Powell Library, after arranging an appointment. The film's copyright was renewed, so will not fall into the public domain until 2027.

The film is the third adaptation of the book produced by Fox. Previous versions are the 1916 release with Theda Bara and the one in 1925 starring Alma Rubens.

Plot
The "trophy" wife of a stodgy man of wealth yearns for a more interesting life. A daughter of a nobleman, her solution leads to scandal, ruin, and an odd denouement.

Cast
Ann Harding as Lady Isabella
Clive Brook as Captain William Levison
Conrad Nagel as Robert Carlyle (name changed from Archibald Carlyle in the book)
Cecilia Loftus as Cornelia Carlyle
Beryl Mercer as Joyce
O.P. Heggie as Lord Mount Severn
 Flora Sheffield  as Barbara Hare
David Torrence as Sir Richard Hare
 J. Gunnis Davis as Dodson, the Butler (uncredited)
 Eric Mayne  as Doctor
 Ronnie Cosby  as William as a child
 Wallie Albright  as William as a boy

Awards
The film was nominated for an Academy Award for Best Picture in 1931.

Other Filmed Versions Based on the Novel

 1912 East Lynne – Short Film - Directed by Theodore Marston - with Florence La Badie and James Cruze
 1913  East Lynne - British Film - Directed by Bert Haldane - with Blanche Forsythe and Fred Paul
 1915 East Lynne – Short Film - Directed by Travers Vale - with Louise Vale and Alan Hale
 1916 East Lynne – Directed by Bertram Bracken - with Theda Bara and Ben Deeley
 1921 East Lynne – Directed by Hugo Ballin - with Mabel Ballin and Edward Earle
 1922 East Lynne - Australian Film - Directed by Charles Hardy - with Ellen Jerdan and Don McAlpine
 1925 East Lynne – Directed by Emmett J. Flynn - with Alma Rubens and Edmund Lowe
 1930 Ex Flame   - Directed by Victor Halperin - with Neil Hamilton and Marian Nixon
 1976 East Lynne – British Television Series - directed by Barney Colehan - with Polly James and Christopher Cazenove
 1982 East Lynne – British Television Film - directed by David Green - with Lisa Eichhorn and Tim Woodward

References

External links
 Bestpictureby.blogspot.com
 Tcm.com
 
 
 Novelization of the screenplay

1931 films
1931 drama films
Fox Film films
Adultery in films
American drama films
American black-and-white films
1930s English-language films
Films based on British novels
Films directed by Frank Lloyd
Films set in England
1930s American films